Tristan Cartledge (born 11 June 1985) is an Australian Rules Football player, who played for the Richmond Football Club and Essendon Football Club. He began his career at Essendon in 2002 after being drafted in the 2002 National Draft at selection 28.

Cartledge only managed 7 games for Essendon before being delisted at the end of the 2006 season by longtime coach Kevin Sheedy.

He was then given a lifeline by Richmond Coach Terry Wallace, when he was selected in round three of the 2007 Rookie Draft at selection 33. He was delisted at the end of the 2008 season after playing 2 games with the club.
Currently plays for North Ballarat in the Ballarat Football League

External links
 https://web.archive.org/web/20070816123759/http://www.essendonfc.com.au/team/player.asp?id=71
 http://www.footywire.com/afl/footy/pp-essendon-bombers--tristan-cartledge
 http://www.afana.com/drupal/node/364
 
 

Richmond Football Club players
Essendon Football Club players
Greater Western Victoria Rebels players
North Ballarat Football Club players
Australian rules footballers from Victoria (Australia)
1985 births
Living people